Mini Ultra•Fresh is a 2004 remix EP promo featuring various songs of Freezepop. The EP was made to promote their future album Maxi Ultra•Fresh. The four songs in this album are four of the eleven songs used in Maxi Ultra•Fresh.

Track listing

References

External links 
 Freezepop.net
 https://www.discogs.com/Freezepop-Mini-UltraFresh/release/1276551

2004 EPs
Freezepop albums